McCaig is a surname. Notable people with the surname include:

Bud McCaig (1929–2005), Canadian businessman
Dave McCaig (born 1971), Canadian cartoonist and colorist
David McCaig (born 1956), Scottish footballer
Donald McCaig (1940–2018), American writer
Doug McCaig (1919–1982), Canadian ice hockey player
John Stuart McCaig (1823–1902), Scottish architect
Iain McCaig (born 1957), Canadian illustrator

See also
McCaig's Tower, Folly building in Scotland, United Kingdom